The Hiroshima City Cultural Exchange Hall (formerly Hiroshima Kōsei Nenkin Kaikan) is a 2,100-seat multi-purpose facility located in Naka-ku, Hiroshima, Japan. It opened in 1985 and has hosted notable artists such as David Bowie and Def Leppard.

References

Concert halls in Japan
1985 establishments in Japan